According to the Tanakh, עזה, Uzzah or Uzza, meaning "Her Strength", was an Israelite whose death is associated with touching the Ark of the Covenant. The account of Uzzah appears in two places in scripture: 2 Samuel 6:3-8 and 1 Chronicles 13:7-11.

Uzzah was the son of Abinadab, in whose house the men of Kirjath-jearim placed the Ark when it was brought back from the land of the Philistines. With his brother Ahio, he drove the cart on which the ark was placed when David sought to bring it up to Jerusalem. When the oxen stumbled, making the ark tilt, Uzzah steadied the ark with his hand, in direct violation of the divine law, and he was immediately killed by the Lord for his error. David, displeased because Yahweh had killed Uzzah, called the place where this occurred "Perez-uzzah", which means "to burst out against Uzzah".

David was afraid to bring the ark any further, and placed it in the house of Obed-edom the Gittite for three months. The Lord then blessed Obed-edom and David went and brought up the ark of God into the city of David.

Other 
 Another biblical character, Uzzah, son of Shimei, was a Merarite.
 Al-ʻUzzā was one of the three chief goddesses of Arabian religion in pre-Islamic times and was worshiped by the pre-Islamic Arabs along with al-Lāt and Manāt.

References

10th-century BCE Hebrew people
People associated with David
Targeted killing
Place of birth unknown
Year of birth unknown
10th-century BC deaths
Israelites
Ark of the Covenant